Robert Kristan (born 4 April 1983) is a Slovenian professional goaltender who currently plays for HK Olimpija in the Alps Hockey League.

Playing career

Kristan played junior youth hockey within Slovenian club HK Jesenice. In 2000 he made his professional debut in the Slovenian league for Jesenice. After five years with Jesenice and one with fellow Slovenian club Olimpija Hertz Ljubljana, Kristian left for the Swedish Elitserien, signing with Brynäs IF for the 2006–07 season. In his only season in the Elitserien, Robert played in 33 games to lead Brynäs to the playoffs and recorded the best Goals against average of 2.23 in the entire SEL. In 2007–08 he returned to HK Jesenice to compete in the EBEL the following season, before again traveling to Sweden in 2008–09 to play with Mora IK of the HockeyAllsvenskan.

On 18 May 2009 he was again on the move and signed a one-year contract with Croatian team KHL Medveščak Zagreb in the EBEL for the 2009–10 season.

He participated at several IIHF World Championships as a member of the Slovenia men's national ice hockey team.

Statistics

Regular season
Team League                      Season            GP GD G A P PIM GAA PCT
Acroni Jesenice Slovenian League 00/01                25 0 1 1 0
Acroni Jesenice International League 00/01         13 20 0 0 0 0   2.77 .863
Acroni Jesenice International League 01/02          4              1.50 .684
Acroni Jesenice Slovenian League 01/02              4 0 0 0 0
Olimpija Hertz Ljubljana International League 02/03 13 16 0 0 0 2  1.46 .946
Olimpija Hertz Ljubljana Slovenian League 02/03        26 0 0 0 0
Acroni Jesenice International League 03/04             16 0 1 1 12
Acroni Jesenice Slovenian League 04/05                 22 0 0 0 27
Acroni Jesenice Continental Cup 05/06               3 3 0 0 0 0    2.00 .904
Acroni Jesenice International League 05/06            17 0 1 1 14
Acroni Jesenice Slovenian League 05/06                23 0 0 0 14
Brynäs IF J20 Superelit (SWE) 06/07                 1  1 0 0 0 0   0.00 1.000
Brynäs IF Elitserien 06/07                         33 47 0 1 1 6   2.23 .909
Acroni Jesenice Austrian League 07/08              39 41 0 0 0 31  2.99 .906

Playoffs
Team League                      Season            GP GD G A P PIM GAA PCT
Olimpija Hertz Ljubljana Slovenian League 02/03        5 0 0 0 4
Acroni Jesenice International League 03/04             7 0 0 1 2
Acroni Jesenice Slovenian League 03/04                 4 0 0 0 0
Acroni Jesenice International League 05/06             6 0 0 1 2
Brynäs IF Elitserien 06/07                          5  5 0 0 1 22   3.38 .886
Acroni Jesenice Austrian League 07/08               5  5 0 0 0 0    3.31 .898
Acroni Jesenice Slovenian League 07/08              5  6 0 0 0 2    1.19

International statistics
Team League Season        GP GD G A P PIM GAA PCT
Team Slovenia-Jr. EJC-I d1 99    2 4  0 0 0  0 3.50 .863
Team Slovenia-Jr. EJC-I 2000    4 4  0 0 0  0 2.72 .845
Team Slovenia-Jr. WJC-C 2000     4 4  0 0 0  0 3.27 .881
Team Slovenia-U18 WJC18-II 2001  4 4  0 0 0  0 1.00 .959
Team Slovenia-Jr. WJC-II 2001    4 4  0 0 0  0 1.75 .908
Team Slovenia WC 2002        0 2
Team Slovenia-Jr. WJC_I 2003    3 5  0 0 0  0 2.87 .918
Team Slovenia WC 2003        1 3  0 0 0  0 7.00 .857
Team Slovenia WC-I 2004     4 5           1.09 .952
Team Slovenia WC 2005        1 1           7.00 .816
Team Slovenia WC 2006        6 6  0 0 0  0 3.81 .887
Team Slovenia WC 2008        4 4  0 0 0  0 4.66 .904

Awards
Best goaltender, 2001 World U18 Championships, Division II
Best goaltender, 2001 World Junior Championships, Division II
Best goalkeeper, Interliga 2004–05
Playoffs MVP, Slovenian league 2007–08

References

External links

1983 births
Living people
Brynäs IF players
HDD Olimpija Ljubljana players
HK Acroni Jesenice players
KHL Medveščak Zagreb players
Slovenian expatriate sportspeople in Sweden
Slovenian expatriate sportspeople in Croatia
Slovenian expatriate sportspeople in Slovakia
Slovenian expatriate sportspeople in the Czech Republic
Mora IK players
Sportspeople from Jesenice, Jesenice
Slovenian ice hockey goaltenders
Olympic ice hockey players of Slovenia
Ice hockey players at the 2014 Winter Olympics
Slovenian expatriate ice hockey people
Expatriate ice hockey players in Sweden
Expatriate ice hockey players in Croatia
Expatriate ice hockey players in Slovakia
Expatriate ice hockey players in the Czech Republic